Adult Contemporary is a chart published by Billboard ranking the top-performing songs in the United States in the adult contemporary music (AC) market.  In 2015, nine different songs topped the chart in 52 issues of the magazine, based on weekly airplay data from radio stations compiled by Nielsen Broadcast Data Systems.

On the first chart of the year, the number one position was held by Idina Menzel and Michael Bublé with their version of the 1940s song "Baby, It's Cold Outside", the song's third consecutive week at number one.  The following week it was displaced by "Shake It Off" by Taylor Swift, which spent five consecutive weeks at number one.  After one week off the top spot, Swift returned to number one with the song "Blank Space".  She would go on to achieve a third chart-topper in the summer with "Style", and was the only act with more than one AC number one in 2015.  Both "Shake It Off" and "Blank Space" also topped Billboards all-genre chart, the Hot 100.

Following Swift's second chart-topper of the year, British singer Ed Sheeran gained his first AC number one with "Thinking Out Loud", which spent 19 non-consecutive weeks in the top spot.  This meant that Sheeran achieved three feats: the longest unbroken run at number one during 2015, the highest total weeks at number one by a song, and the highest total weeks at number one by an artist.  The final number one of the year was "Hello" by another British singer, Adele, which reached the peak position in the issue of Billboard dated November 28.  The first track to be made available from her eagerly-anticipated third album 25, "Hello" sold a record number of downloads in its first week of release.  The song was the first track for 13 years to break into the top 5 of the traditionally slow-moving AC chart inside three weeks, and reached number one in its fourth week on the chart.  In contrast, "Maps" by the group Maroon 5, released the previous summer, had taken more than seven months to finally reach the summit of the chart in February.  Adele's song remained at number one for the final five weeks of 2015.

Chart history

See also
2015 in American music

References

2015
Number-one adult contemporary singles
United States Adult Contemporary